Anton Gourianov (born 12 December 1979) is a Russian sport shooter.

He participated at the 2018 ISSF World Shooting Championships, winning a medal.

References

External links

Living people
1979 births
Russian male sport shooters
ISSF pistol shooters
Sportspeople from Rostov-on-Don
European Games competitors for Russia
Shooters at the 2015 European Games